Umar Khan may refer to:
 Umar Khan Jamali, Pakistani politician
 Umar Khan (umpire), Pakistani former umpire
 Umer Khan (cricketer), Pakistani cricketer
 Omar Khan (administrator) (born 1977), American football executive
Omar Ayub Khan (born 1970), Pakistani politician
Omar Asghar Khan (1953–2002), Pakistani social activist, social scientist, economist and politician
 General Omar Khan, Yuan Dynasty general during the Battle of Bạch Đằng
 Omar Khan (businessman), Indian restaurant chain owner and owner of the Bradford Bulls